Sergey Ivlev (born 14 February 1969) is a Russian water polo player. He competed in the men's tournament at the 1996 Summer Olympics.

See also
 List of World Aquatics Championships medalists in water polo

References

External links
 

1969 births
Living people
Russian male water polo players
Olympic water polo players of Russia
Water polo players at the 1996 Summer Olympics
Place of birth missing (living people)